Jack Arthur Harvey (August 6, 1918 – November 21, 1981) was an All-American basketball forward/center at the University of Colorado from 1937 to 1940. As a senior in 1939–40, Harvey became the first Buffaloes basketball player to earn a Consensus All-American distinction when he garnered a Second Team accolade. He had also been recognized as a First Team All-American in 1939, although he was not a consensus selection. Harvey led the Buffaloes to two conference championships and a trip to the NCAA tournament his senior season. During his junior and senior years, Colorado posted a 31–8 record and spent some time as the #1 team in the country.

No records of Harvey's scoring and rebounding statistics have ever been found. He was known as a tenacious defender, however, which is probably a leading cause for his All-American distinction in 1939 and 1940.

In 1942, Harvey helped lead the Denver American Legion of the AAU to a national championship by defeating the Phillips 66ers 45–32.

Harvey died on November 21, 1981 at age 63.

References

1918 births
1981 deaths
All-American college men's basketball players
Amateur Athletic Union men's basketball players
American men's basketball players
Basketball players from Kansas
Centers (basketball)
Colorado Buffaloes men's basketball players
Forwards (basketball)
People from Marshall County, Kansas